Indivisible is a 2016 Italian drama film directed by Edoardo De Angelis. It premiered in the Venice Days section at the 73rd Venice International Film Festival and was later screened in the Contemporary World Cinema section at the 2016 Toronto International Film Festival.

Cast
 Angela Fontana as Daisy
 Marianna Fontana as Viola
 Massimiliano Rossi as Peppe
 Antonia Truppo as Titti
 Gianfranco Gallo as Don Salvatore
 Toni Laudadio as Nunzio
 Peppe Servillo as Alfonso Fasano
 Antonio Pennarella as Salvo Coriace

References

External links
 

2016 films
2016 drama films
Italian drama films
2010s Italian-language films
Films about twin sisters
2010s Italian films